Dewsbury Central was the Great Northern station serving eastern Dewsbury in Yorkshire. It opened in 1874 and closed on 7 September 1964, although goods traffic continued along its route until 15 February 1965, after which the line serving the station was closed entirely. It is located to the east of Dewsbury railway station, which has remained open since.

The station had a single large island platform with a glass roof accessed from below through an entrance on Crackenedge Lane. This entrance survives as part of the embankment, which after the closure of the railway had the A638 Dewsbury Ring Road built over it. As well as this, some sections of the nearby trackbed have been preserved and turned into a footpath.

References

Buildings and structures in Dewsbury
Former Great Northern Railway stations
Railway stations in Great Britain opened in 1874
Railway stations in Great Britain closed in 1964
Beeching closures in England